Jim Durnan (born 18 April 1960) is a former Australian rules footballer who played with Melbourne in the Victorian Football League (VFL).  He later played for Prahran in the Victorian Football Association, winning a Division 2 premiership with the club in 1987 before retiring. He returned to coach the club in 1994, its final season in the VFA.

Notes

External links 		
		
		
		
		
		
		
1960 births
Living people
Australian rules footballers from Victoria (Australia)		
Melbourne Football Club players
Prahran Football Club players
Prahran Football Club coaches